The Bishop of Dunblane or Bishop of Strathearn was the ecclesiastical head of the Diocese of Dunblane or Strathearn, one of medieval Scotland's thirteen bishoprics. It was based at Dunblane Cathedral, now a parish church of the Church of Scotland. The bishopric itself certainly derives from an older Gaelic Christian community. According to legend, the Christian community of Dunblane was derived from the mission of St. Bláán, a saint originally associated with the monastery of Cenn Garath (Kingarth) on the Isle of Bute. Although the bishopric had its origins in the 1150s or before, the cathedral was not built nor was the seat (cathedra) of the diocese fixed at Dunblane until the episcopate of Clement.

The Bishopric's links with Rome ceased to exist after the Scottish Reformation, but continued, saving temporary abolition between 1638 and 1661, under the episcopal Church of Scotland until the Revolution of 1688. Episcopacy in the established church in Scotland was permanently abolished in 1689 but  later continued in the (unofficial) Episcopal Church of Scotland.

List of bishops of Dunblane

Pre-Reformation bishops

Church of Scotland bishops

Scottish Episcopal bishops

Catholic titular bishops
In the Post-Reformation Roman Catholic church in Scotland, Dunblane is under the Roman Catholic Bishop of Dunkeld

See also
 Diocese of Dunblane

References

 Cockburn, James Hutchison, The Medieval Bishops of Dunblane and Their Church, (Edinburgh, 1959)
 Dowden, John, The Bishops of Scotland, ed. J. Maitland Thomson, (Glasgow, 1912)
 Keith, Robert, An Historical Catalogue of the Scottish Bishops: Down to the Year 1688, (London, 1824)
 Watt, D. E. R., Fasti Ecclesiae Scotinanae Medii Aevi ad annum 1638, 2nd Draft, (St Andrews, 1969)

External links
Dauvit Broun's list of 12th century Scottish Bishops

 Bishop of Dunblane
Strathernia